Zagorica is a village east of Videm in the Municipality of Dobrepolje in Slovenia. The area is part of Lower Carniola and the municipality is now included in the Central Slovenia Statistical Region.

Notable people
Notable people that were born or lived in Zagorica include:
France Kralj (1895–1960), sculptor and painter
Tone Kralj (1900–1975), sculptor and painter

References

External links
Zagorica on Geopedia

Populated places in the Municipality of Dobrepolje